Rage of the Yeti is a 2011 monster movie by Syfy.

Plot summary
Two groups of treasure hunters, each from all walks of life are dispatched to the Arctic to get items that a wealthy millionaire, Mills is interested in but both groups soon find themselves fighting for their lives as they battle the freezing cold, Russians and a pack of crazed Yetis.

Cast
 David Chokachi as Jonas
 Matthew Kevin Anderson as Jace
 Yancy Butler as Villers
 Laura Haddock as Ashley
 Atanas Srebrev as Eidelman
 David Hewlett as Mills
 Jonas Armstrong as Bill
 James Patric Moran as Ted
 Rosalind Halstead as Lynda
 Emilia Klayn as Laura
 Jesse Steele as Walterson
 Mike Straub as Hedges
 Mark Dymond as Bud
 Kitodar Todorov as The Maitre Di
 Hristo Balabanov as Chopper Guy 1
 Jordan Andonov as Chopper Guy 2
 Igmar Uribe as Guard
 Velislav Pavlov as Pilot
 V.J. Benson as Co-Pilot

References

External links
 
 

Syfy original films
2011 television films
2011 films
2011 horror films
2010s monster movies
American monster movies
Films about Yeti
American horror television films
2010s English-language films
2010s American films
Films set in the Arctic